Batié is a department or commune of Noumbiel Province in southeastern Burkina Faso. Its capital is the town of Batié.

References 

Departments of Burkina Faso
Noumbiel Province